Étienne Balazs (born István Balázs; 24 January 1905 – 29 November 1963) was a Hungarian-born French sinologist.

Major works
 Le traité économique du "Soueichou", (Leiden: Brill, 1953). Google Books.
 Le traité juridique du "Soueichou", 1954.
 Chinese Civilization and Bureaucracy; Variations on a Theme. (New Haven: Yale University Press,  1964). Translated by H. M. Wright. Edited by Arthur F. Wright. Google Books. Reprints a selection from Balazs' major articles:

Pt I INSTITUTIONS: •    Significant Aspects of Chinese Society •    China as a Permanently Bureaucratic Society •    Chinese Feudalism  •    The birth of capitalism in China •    Fairs in China •    Chinese Towns •    Marco Polo in the Capital of China •    Evolution of Landownership in Fourth and Fifth Century China •    Landownership from the Fourth to the Fourteenth Century

Pt II HISTORY •    History as a Guide to Bureaucratic Practive •    Tradition and Revolution in China
PT III THOUGHT •    Two Songs by Ts' ao Ts' ao •    Political Philosophy and Social Crisis at the end of the Han Dynasty •    Nihilistic Revolt or Mystical Escapism •    A Forerunner of Wang Anshi.

 Political Theory and Administrative Reality in Traditional China. (London: School of Oriental and African Studies, University of London,  1965). With an Introduction by Denis Twitchett
 Histoire et institutions de la Chine ancienne des origines au XIIe siècle après J. C., 1967 (with H. Maspero).
 La Bureaucratie Céleste, Recherches Sur L'économie Et La Société De La Chine Traditionnelle. (Paris: Gallimard, Bibliothèque Des Sciences Humaines,  1968).  Revised translation of a collection of articles originally published as Chinese civilization and bureaucracy.
 Françoise Aubin, Balazs Etienne. Etudes Song. In Memoriam Etienne Balazs. (Paris: Mouton,  1970).   .
 with Yves Hervouet. A Sung Bibliography. (Hong Kong: The Chinese University Press,  1978).   .

References

 Paul Demiéville, "Étienne Balazs (1905-1963)," T'oung Pao 51.2/3  (1964):  247-261.JSTOR
 Harriet T Zurndorfer, "Not Bound to China: Etienne Balazs, Fernand Braudel and the Politics of the Study of Chinese History in Post-War France," Past & Present 185.1  (2004):  189-221.
Conrad Schirokauer,  "Balazs on China." Journal of the History of Ideas 26.4 (1965): 593-597. JSTOR
 Wolfgang Franke, "Etienne Balazs in Memoriam," Oriens Extremus XII (1965).

External links
 "Étienne Balazs" Authority page WorldCat

French non-fiction writers
French sinologists
1905 births
1963 deaths
20th-century French historians
French male non-fiction writers
20th-century French male writers
Hungarian emigrants to France